Lady Moura is a private luxury yacht. She was the ninth largest private yacht when she was launched in 1990 for USD$200 million but has moved down the list in 2021 to number 48. She was owned by Saudi Arabian businessman, Nasser Al-Rashid but bought by a Mexican businessman in 2021 from yacht broker Camper & Nicholsons for USD$125 million.

Lady Moura has hosted several notable personalities, including George H. W. Bush and his wife Barbara. Lady Moura ran aground in 2007 during the weekend of the Cannes Film Festival.

Characteristics

Both the hull and the superstructure are made of steel. The propulsion plant consists of two KHD-MWM diesel engines, each with a power of 5050 kW (over 6700 bhp) with controllable pitch propellers the vessel is capable of producing a speed of over 20 knots.

Lady Moura has accommodations for 27 guests in 13 cabins, while the crew quarters sleep 60 staff. She also features a helipad, movie theatre, disco with DJ room, gym, an owner’s study, and medical suites for both guests and crew.

Naval architect: Luigi Sturchio – Diana Yacht Design 
Architectural Lighting Design: Maurizio Rossi Lighting Design
Lady Moura has a Sikorsky S76 helicopter onboard, which was formerly registered VP-BIR.

Tenders
Lady Moura carries a 38 foot SanJuan tender designed by Gregory C. Marshall

Also carries the world's premiere Wakesurfing vessel, A 24' Nautique GS series outfitted by Miami Nautique.

See also
List of motor yachts by length

References

External links
Lady Moura picture gallery
Inside the Lady Moura - The veil has been lifted

Ships built in Hamburg
Motor yachts
1990 ships